Cyathocrinitidae is an extinct family of crinoids belonging to the order Cladida.

These stationary intermediate-level epifaunal suspension feeders lived from the Silurian to the Permian periods (436.0 - 254.0 Ma).

Genera
Cyathocrinites
Cyathocrinus
Gissocrinus
Ichthyocrinus
Meniscocrinus
Occiducrinus

References 

Cladida
Prehistoric echinoderm families
Silurian first appearances
Permian extinctions